The Road to Gettysburg is a 1982 video game published by Strategic Simulations for the Apple II.

Gameplay
The Road to Gettysburg is a game in which the player is the commander of an army during the American Civil War.

Reception
Bob Proctor reviewed the game for Computer Gaming World, and stated that "If you're new to wargaming, and are interested in The War Between The States, I'd suggest you start with the much simpler Battle of Shiloh. If you want the best that's available, TRTG is it."

References

External links
1984 Software Encyclopedia from Electronic Games
Review in Creative Computing
Review in Family Computing
Review in Apple Orchard

1982 video games
American Civil War video games
Apple II games
Apple II-only games
Computer wargames
Gettysburg campaign
Strategic Simulations games
Turn-based strategy video games
Video games developed in the United States